Naso minor is a tropical fish found in coral reefs around Mozambique and the Philippines. It is commonly known as the blackspine unicornfish, slender unicorn,  or little unicorn.

References

External links
 

Naso (fish)
Fish described in 1966
Taxa named by J. L. B. Smith